Sebaceous adenitis in an uncommon skin disease found in some breeds of dog, and more rarely in cats, rabbits and horses. characterised by an inflammatory response against the dog's sebaceous glands (glands found in the hair follicles in the skin dermis), which can lead to the destruction of the gland. It was first described in veterinary literature in the 1980s.

Signs
There are two expressions of this condition, one for long or double coated breeds and one for short coated breeds, both with differing presentations.

 For long- or double-coated breeds such as Poodles, Akitas and Samoyeds, the condition often presents itself with silvery dandruff which adheres to the coat, hair loss (not to be confused with moulting or "blowing coat"), a dull and brittle coat, and later on skin lesions along the back and ears as well as thickened skin and a musty or rancid odour. 
 For short-coated breeds such as Vizslas, the condition causes facial swellings, nodular skin lesions, fine dandruff which does not adhere to the coat, and a general "moth-eaten" appearance to the coat.

Cause

The signs of sebaceous adenitis are caused by an inflammatory disease process which affects the sebaceous glands of the skin. The cause of the inflammatory disease is unknown. Different breeds of dogs may have different underlying causes of the disease.

Research is currently underway to find if there is a genetic predisposition for sebaceous adenitis; the exact mode of inheritance remains unknown.

In Standard Poodles, sebaceous adenitis is most likely an autosomal recessive inherited disease, with variable expression.

Diagnosis
In general, sebaceous adenitis is underdiagnosed in dogs. Diagnosis confirmation requires multiple punch biopsies analysed by a dermopathologist who will comment on the condition of the sebaceous glands, revealing granulomatous or pyogranulomatous inflammation surrounding the sebaceous glands or even complete destruction of sebaceous glands.

Other conditions with similar presentations include: bacterial folliculitis and demodicosis, dermatophytosis, endocrinopathy, pemphigus foliaceus, zinc responsive dermatosis, vitamin A-responsive dermatosis, ichthyosis, and nutritional deficiencies. As well as, superficial pyoderma, primary idiopathic seborrhea and other endocrine diseases.

Treatment
There is no cure for this condition. Treatment is generally lifelong and takes the form of bathing and soaking in mineral oils and washing with antibiotic shampoos to try to alleviate symptoms and slow the condition's progression. Antiseptic and antibiotic shampoos (chlorhexidine or benzoyl peroxide) are used to manage further secondary bacterial infection. For some breeds, cyclosporine or corticosteroids and immunosuppressant drugs may be effective, and it is postulated, through some studies, that large doses of vitamin A given orally may result in some improvement.

It has been suggested that the more aggressively one applies the topical methods of treatment, the less aggressively one needs to employ the immunosuppressant therapy. The suggestion is that this phenomenon may be due to a cyclic feedback whereby secondary infection, when not aggressively treated with topical therapy, increases and contributes to further sebaceous gland inflammation.

Topical therapy 
This forms a major and critical part in the disease treatment and the shampoo treatment can need to be applied as often as 3 to 4 times per week. An antiseborrheic shampoo removes the scale blocking the follicles. The mineral oil soak, whereby the oil remains on the affected animal for at least 2 hours, is needed to replace epidermal lipids as well as to restore normal epidermal barrier function. The oil is then removed through the process of many baths. This oil treatment needs to be repeated at least once a week for 4 to 7 weeks until new hair growth is observed. Once new hair growth is observed, topical treatment can be decreased to every 2 to 4 weeks.

Immunosuppressant therapy 
Immunosuppressant and anti-inflammatory therapy serves to stop on-going destruction of the sebaceous glands. Like other inflammatory diseases, most animals receive an initial course to stop the inflammation and treatment is tapered off to the lowest dose that keeps the disease in remission. Oral cyclosporine may be used. Corticosteroids (e.g. prednisone) are used only if pruritus is a major clinical feature.

Dietary supplementation 
Commonly used dietary supplements include:

 Omega-6 fatty acids (e.g., safflower or sunflower oil)
 Omega-3 fatty acids (e.g., fish oils)
 Vitamin A.

Epidemiology
While the condition has been seen in over 60 breeds of dog (including cross breeds), certain breeds have been found to be more susceptible than others to sebaceous adenitis:

 American Akita and Akita Inu
 Standard Poodle
 Vizsla
English Springer Spaniel
 Chow Chow
 Samoyed
 Weimaraner
 Havanese
Breeds also mentioned in scientific literature as having some susceptibility include:
 German Shepherd
 Dachshund
 Old English Sheepdog
 Lhasa Apso
 Boxer
 Collie
 Toy Poodle
 Mixed-breeds

Sebaceous adenitis has no sex-predisposition. Sebaceous adenitis also occurs in cats, rabbits, and horses.

Etymology
Sebaceous refers to the gland which is affected by the disease. Adenitis is a general term referring to the inflammation of a gland.

See also

References

Further reading
 

Dog diseases
Autoimmune diseases